A mop (such as a floor mop) is a mass or bundle of coarse strings or yarn, etc., or a piece of cloth, sponge or other absorbent material, attached to a pole or stick. It is used to soak up liquid, for cleaning floors and other surfaces, to mop up dust, or for other cleaning purposes.

History
The word (then spelled mappe) is attested in English as early as 1496, but new refinements and variations of mop designs have been introduced, from time to time. For example, American inventor Jacob Howe received US patent #241 for a mop holder in 1837 and Thomas W. Stewart (US patent #499,402) in 1893.

In her book Maggie's Memories Margaret Wadkin (late of Hickling, near Melton Mowbray in England) describes the use of a mop nail for constructing homemade mops from old pieces of cloth during her village childhood in the early 20th century;

Types

Many different proprietary designs are available, but the classic string mop design is also still widely used.

Dry mop, dust mop
A dry mop or dust mop is designed to pick up dry, loose contamination such as dust, earth, and sand from the surface of the floor. It consists of yarn and/or microfiber and can be used as a first step in cleaning a floor.

The dry mop can in many instances replace a broom and has the ability to hold a limited amount of dust, sand, and debris within itself. The heads of dry mops are often removable and can be washed and replaced when saturated with dust. Another option is using a vacuum cleaner to suck surface dust away from the mop; however, this is much more limited in its effectiveness.

Single-use dry mops are also available and widely sold.

Wet-mop, moist-mop
A wet mop or moist mop is, in professional cleaning, used as in the second step in the cleaning of a surface. The wet mop is swept over the surface to dissolve and absorb fat, mud, and dried-on liquid contaminations.

Mops for pre-moistening

Professional flat mops are made for pre-moistening. Mops are pre-impregnated with an ideal amount of water mixed with an appropriate amount of detergent. This means that the cleaner does not need to bring any additional water on the cleaning trolley. This ideal amount is often recommended by the manufacturer in terms of weight percentage of water per weight of the dry mop, for example "175% water per weight of the dry mop".

Mops for pre-moistening are fastened on a handle with a flat pad mount with the aid of Velcro or a pouch on the mop, in which the pad on the handle fits.

Pre-moistening can be done with a special washing machine, or by hand by simply folding and packing the mops tight in a container and pouring the measured amount of water over them. The mops will then need about 5–10 minutes for the liquid to distribute evenly in their tissue before use. This offers some advantages:
 The cleaner does not have to bring a heavy bucket of water when mopping the floor, but simply carries an appropriate number of mops. This means the weight of the equipment can often be kept lower.
 The risk of over-wetting the floor and leave puddles is reduced.

Hot mop
The hot mop (or steam mop) follows a similar concept to a steam iron. After adding water, the water is heated to make it exude on top of a floor, which can then be cleaned without using a cleaning solvent. These can work best on surfaces where a regular mop would also be used, such as bare floors, hearths, and laminate.

Microfiber mop
Microfiber mops are constructed of a blend of polyester and polyamide fibers which are "split" and formed into a single fiber. This blend consists of 70–90% polyester that serves as the scrubbing and cleaning fiber and 10–30% polyamide which performs as the holding and quick drying fiber. This blend is usually expressed as a ratio on the label of the mop, e.g. an 80% polyester and 20% polyamide blend would be labeled as "80/20".

Sponge mop

Sponge mop heads are constructed with a cellulosic, rubber, or plastic foam block, usually attached by crimping a metal clip on one side. Sometimes, the foam mop head may be covered by a cloth or mesh sheet, to improve its resistance to wear from heavy scrubbing.

The sponge is then attached to a handle mechanism which can compress the mop head, by means of rollers or a pivoted flat perforated blade. For consumer-grade sponge mops, the mop mechanism may be made of either plastic or metal. For heavy-duty or professional use, the mechanism is usually made of a corrosion-resistant metal such as stainless steel, and the mop head is often rubber or premium plastic foam.

For clean room environments, a stainless steel handle and mechanism are preferred, along with a mop head made of a foam which has been formulated to minimize shedding of small particles. For use in microbiological labs, mops are made of materials which can be sterilized by autoclave or by ethylene oxide treatment.

Cloth mop
A cloth mop (also called a "Cuban mop") is a simple T-shaped wooden handle, around which is wrapped a sturdy cloth towel. Its advantages are low cost and easy replacement of the mop head, which can simply be washed by hand or tossed into a washing machine.

Handles and mounting
A mop handle consists of a long piece of wood or metal tubing fitted with a specific attachment for the mop head. The handle can be attached the mop head by means of:

 clamp
 hanger (with strands doubled over the hanger)
 plastic claws (attached to the strands)
 pouch (as with many professional flat mops)
 screwing (as with the classic yarn mop)
 Velcro (as with many professional flat mops)

Gallery

See also
 Floor buffer
 Floor scrubber
 Mop dog

References

External links 
 

Cleaning tools
Domestic implements